SWIV is a vertically scrolling shooter released in 1991 for the Amiga, Atari ST, Commodore 64, MSX, ZX Spectrum, and Amstrad CPC computers. A Game Boy Color conversation was published in 2001.

The game was considered a spiritual successor to Tecmo arcade game Silkworm, which The Sales Curve had previously converted to home computer formats in 1989. The game's heritage is evident from the game design whereby one player pilots a helicopter, and the other an armoured Jeep. SWIV is not an official sequel, as noted by ex-Sales Curve producer Dan Marchant: "SWIV wasn't really a sequel to Silkworm, but it was certainly inspired by it and several other shoot-'em-ups that we had played and loved."

In the game's Amiga manual, however, it was explained that "SWIV" was both an acronym for "Special Weapons Interdiction Vehicle" and also short for "Silkworm IV" (even though there was not a Silkworm II or III).

Gameplay 
SWIV is a 2D vertically scrolling shooter. The player chooses between using either a helicopter or a jeep at the beginning of the game and then plays in their chosen vehicles through scrolling levels, shooting at oncoming enemies. If two players are present, both vehicles will be used at once. Certain enemies when shot drop shield power-ups which can be either picked up to afford temporarily invincibility or detonated to destroy all enemies onscreen. Every so often a boss enemy will attack. The destruction of these bosses will give upgrades to the player's forward firing gun.

Reception 
On release SWIV was met with positive reviews from most magazines of the time, receiving a 92% from Amiga Format magazine, an 88% from Commodore Format (C64 version) a 91% from Amiga Action, 90% from Computer and Video Games, and a 90% from Your Sinclair. It was ranked the 27th best game of all time by Amiga Power.

Legacy 
A sequel was published for the Super Nintendo Entertainment System as Super SWIV. It was ported to the Mega Drive as Mega SWIV. In 1997 SWIV 3D was released, with 3D terrain and models.

References

External links
Hall SWIV at Amiga Hall of Light
SWIV at Lemon Amiga

1991 video games
Square Enix franchises
Acorn Archimedes games
Amiga games
Amstrad CPC games
Atari ST games
Commodore 64 games
Helicopter video games
MSX games
Video games developed in the United Kingdom
ZX Spectrum games
Game Boy Color games
Vertically scrolling shooters